Guishan District is a district in northeastern Taoyuan City, Taiwan.

History
Guishan was formerly known as Kulunsia ( (Ku-lun-siā)). The name originated from a hill by the Mercy Buddha Temple of Shou Shan Rock, built in 7th year of the Qianlong Period of the Qing Dynasty. The plains aborigines and Ketagalan tribes were located here.

From 1920 to 1945,  was under Tōen District, Shinchiku Prefecture.

In 1950, it was renamed to Kueishan. On 25 December 2014, it was upgraded from Guishan Township to a district called Guishan District.

Geography
 Area: 75.50km2
 Population: 173,643 people (February 2023)

Administrative divisions

Ching-chung, Liou-kuang, Chung-hsing, Hsin-hsing, Hsin-lu, Kuei-shan, Ta-tung, Shan-ting, Shan-teh, Shan-fu, Hsing-fu, Lung-shou, Lung-hwa, Huei-lung, Ling-ting, Hsin-ling, Tu-keng, Fu-yuan, Chiou-lu, Ta-keng, Fung-shu, Leh-shan, Chang-keng, Kung-hsi, Ta-kang, Ta-hu, Ta-hwa, Wuen-hua, Nan-shang and Nan-mei Village.

Government and infrastructure
The Ministry of Justice operates the Taipei Prison in Guishan.

Education

 Chang Gung University
 Chang Gung University of Science and Technology
 Lunghwa University of Science and Technology
 Ming Chuan University
 National Taiwan Sport University

Infrastructure
 Kuokuang Power Plant
 Taoyuan Refinery

Tourist attractions

 Dahu Memorial Park

 Formosa Plastics Group Museum
 Guishan Sports Park
 Hutou Mountain Park
 Taoyuan Sake Brewery
 World Police Museum

Transportation

The TRA section between Yingge and Taoyuan passes through Guishan District, but no station is currently planned.

Road
 National Highway No. 1
 Provincial Highway No. 1
 Provincial Highway No. 1A
 City Route No. 105

Taipei Metro
 Huilong Station

Taoyuan Airport MRT
 National Taiwan Sport University metro station
 Chang Gung Memorial Hospital metro station

See also
 Taoyuan City

References

External links
 
  

Districts of Taoyuan City
Taiwan placenames originating from Formosan languages